List of Guggenheim Fellowships awarded in 1981.

1981 U.S. and Canadian Fellows

 Walter Abish, Writer, New York City
 Claude Abraham, Professor Emeritus French, University of California, Davis
 Alice Adams, Artist, Bronx, New York
 Eric G. Adelberger, Professor of Physics, University of Washington
 Reginald Edgar Allen, Professor of Philosophy and Classics, Northwestern University
 David Hershel Alpers, William B. Kountz Professor of Medicine, Washington University School of Medicine
 Peter G. Anastos, Choreographer, Cincinnati, Ohio
 Elliot Aronson, Emeritus Professor of Psychology, University of California, Santa Cruz
 Margaret Atwood, Writer, Toronto
 James L. Axtell, William J. Kenan, Jr. Professor of Humanities, College of William and Mary
 Edward Bakst, Film Maker, New York City
 Rudolf Baranik, Deceased. Fine Arts
 Pranab Kumar Bardhan, Professor of Economics, University of California, Berkeley
 Edward Barnes, Composer, New York City
 Elizabeth Ann Bates, Professor of Psychology & Cognitive Science, University of California, San Diego
 Larry Thomas Bell, Composer, Boston
 Peter Mayo Bell, Geophysicist, Carnegie Institution of Washington's Geophysical Laboratory, Washington, DC
 Warren Frank Benson, Composer; Emeritus Professor of Composition, Eastman School of Music
 Darwin K. Berg, Professor of Biology, University of California, San Diego
 Albert Jeffrey Berger, Professor of Physiology and Biophysics, University of Washington, School of Medicine
 Marshall Howard Berman, Writer; Professor of Political Science, City College and Graduate Center, City University of New York
 Thomas Paul Bernstein, Associate Professor of Political Science, Columbia University
 Gina Berriault, Writer; Assistant Professor of Creative Writing, San Francisco State University
 Michael James Berry, Robert A. Welch Professor of Chemistry, Rice University
 Jake Berthot, Artist, New York City
 John Simeon Block, Film Maker, Upper Montclair, New Jersey
 Skip Blumberg, Video Artist, New York City.
 Jean V. Bony, Deceased. Architecture
 Weston Thatcher Borden, Professor of Chemistry, University of Washington
 Anthony Braxton, Composer, Middleton, Connecticut
 Ann Lesley Brown, Professor of Educational Psychology, University of California, Berkeley
 Paul Louis Brown, Artist, Brooklyn, New York
 Anne Pippin Burnett, Emeritus Professor of Classics, University of Chicago
 Gerald Busby, Composer, New York City
 Daryle H. Busch, Roy A. Roberts Distinguished Professor of Chemistry, University of Kansas, Lawrence
 Frederick Busch, Writer; Edgar W. B. Fairchild Professor of Literature, Colgate University
 Walter Cahn, Carnegie Professor of the History of Art, Yale University
 Calum MacNeill Carmichael, Professor of Comparative Literature and Biblical Studies, Cornell University
 Karen A. Carson, Artist, Santa Monica, California
 David Chandler, Professor of Chemistry, University of California at Berkeley
 Fredric Lawrence Cheyette, Professor of History, Amherst College
 Tom Clancy, Artist, New York City
 Michael Tran Clegg, Professor of Genetics, University of California, Riverside, CA
 Arthur Morris Cohen, Artist, New York City
 Bernard Cecil Cohen, Vice-Chancellor Emeritus and Quincy Wright Professor Emeritus of Political Science, University of Wisconsin–Madison
 Joel E. Cohen, Abby Rockefeller Mauzé Professor of Populations, Rockefeller University
 Thomas James Colchie, Translator, New York City
 George Ramsay Cook, Professor of History, York University
 Peter M. Daly, chairman, Professor of German, McGill University
 Julie Dash, Film Maker, Atlanta, Georgia
 Alvin E. Davis, III, Professor of Pediatrics, Children's Hospital, Cincinnati OH
 William Theodore de Bary, John Mitchell Mason Professor and Provost Emeritus, Columbia University
 Gérard Defaux, Professor of French, Johns Hopkins University
 Mary Madeline DeFrees, Poet, Seattle, Washington
 Andrew David deGroat, Choreographer
 Eric Delson, Professor of Anthropology, Herbert Lehman College and Graduate Center, City University of New York
 Stuart Ross Dempster, Composer; Emeritus Professor of Music, University of Washington
 Martha Ann Derthick, Julia Allen Cooper Professor of Government and Foreign Affairs, University of Virginia at Charlottesville
 William G. Dever, Professor of Near Eastern Archaeology and Anthropology, University of Arizona
 Charles Donahue, Jr., Professor of Law, Harvard Law School
 Donald Frank DuBois, Group Leader, Statistical Physics and Materials Theory Group, University of California, Los Alamos Scientific Laboratory
 Jay Dusard, Photographer and Writer, Prescott, Arizona
 Stuart Dybek, Writer; Distinguished Professor of English, Western Michigan University
 Harrison Echols, Deceased. Biochemistry & Molecular Biology
 Harold M. Edwards, Professor of Mathematics, New York University
 Elizabeth L. Eisenstein, Alice Freeman Palmer Professor Emeritus of History, University of Michigan
 Robert Francis Engs, Professor of History, University of Pennsylvania
 Jay Franklin Fellows, Deceased. 19th Century English Literature
 John Arthur Ferejohn, William Bennett Munro Professor of Political Science, Stanford University
 Franklin M. Fisher, Professor of Economics, Massachusetts Institute of Technology
 Robert Fizdale, Deceased. Biography
 Kent V. Flannery, James B. Griffin Distinguished University Professor of Anthropology and Curator, Museum of Anthropology, University of Michigan
 Suzanne Fleischman, Professor of French and Romance Philology, University of California, Berkeley
 Bengt Fornberg, Professor of Applied Mathematics, University of Colorado
 Murray J. Fraser, Retired Professor of Pediatrics, Children's Hospital, Sydney, Australia
 Michael Frede, Philosopher
 Eliot L. Freidson, Professor of Sociology, New York University
 William Gaddis, Deceased. Fiction
 Bruce Ganem, Franz and Elisabeth Roessler Professor of Chemistry, Cornell University
 Robert Erwin Garis, Writer; Katherine Lee Bates Professor Emeritus of English, Wellesley College
 Christopher John Garrett, Professor of Oceanography, University of Victoria, Canada
 Ernest Gellhorn, Professor of Law and Dean, School of Law, Case Western Reserve University
 William A. Gibbons, Head, Professor of Chemistry, University of London
 John Glad, Associate Professor of Germanic and Slavic Languages and Literatures, University of Maryland at College Park
 Joanna McClelland Glass, Playwright, Novelist, Screenwriter, Toronto
 Arthur Gold, Deceased. Biography
 Joseph Goldstein, Stanley Ruttenberg Professor of Law, Yale Law School
 David Gordon, director, Pick Up Company, New York City
 Harold Grad, Deceased. Applied Mathematics
 William Albert Graham, Jr., Professor of the History of Religion and Islamic Studies, Harvard University
 Mark Granovetter, Joan Butler Ford Professor of Sociology, Stanford University
 Robert Molten Gray, Professor of Electrical Engineering, Stanford University
 Robert L. Griess, Professor of Mathematics, University of Michigan
 Sanford Jay Grossman, Steinberg Trustee Professor of Finance, The Wharton School of the University of Pennsylvania
 Branko Grünbaum, Professor of Mathematics, University of Washington
 James Edwin Guillet, Emeritus Professor of Chemistry, University of Toronto
 C. David Gutsche, Robert A. Welch Professor of Chemistry, Texas Christian University
 Allen Guttmann, Professor of English and American Studies, Amherst College
 David Drisko Hall, Professor of American Religious History and Bartlett Lecturer on New England Church History, Harvard University
 Dolores Hayden, Professor of Architecture, Urbanism and American Studies, Yale University
 Max Knobler Hecht, Professor of Biology, Queens College and Graduate Center
 Donald R. Helinski, Research Professor of Biology, University of California, San Diego
 T. Walter Herbert, Herman Brown Professor of English, Southwestern University
 Alfred John Hiltebeitel, Professor of Religion, George Washington University
 Derek Michael Hirst, William Eliot Smith Professor of History, Washington University in St. Louis
 Melvin Hochster, R.L. Wilder Professor of Mathematics, University of Michigan
 Cecelia Holland, Writer, Fortuna, California
 Denis Hollier, Professor of French, Yale University
 Ole R. Holsti, Emeritus Professor of International Affairs, Duke University
 Lawrence Hubert, Lyle H. Lanier Professor of Psychology, University of Illinois at Urbana-Champaign
 Allan Jacobs, Professor of City and Regional Planning, University of California, Berkeley
 John D. Joannopoulos, Associate Professor of Physics, Massachusetts Institute of Technology
 Christopher H. Johnson, Professor of History, Wayne State University
 Elizabeth W. Jones, Professor of Biological Sciences, Carnegie-Mellon University
 Kenneth D. Jordan, Professor of Chemistry, University of Pittsburgh
 Harold H. Kelley, Professor Emeritus of Psychology, University of California, Los Angeles
 Martyn Carden Kellman, Emeritus Professor of Geography, York University
 Daniel J. Kevles, J.O. and Juliette Koepfli Professor of the Humanities, California Institute of Technology
 Vera Klement, Artist; Emeritus Professor of Art, University of Chicago
 Arthur Louis Koch, Professor, Department of Microbiology, Indiana University
 Melvin Joel Konner, Professor of Anthropology and Assistant Professor of Psychiatry, Emory University
 Josef Krames, Film Maker; Communications Coordinator, The Cleveland Clinic Educational Foundation
 William Bernard Kristan, Jr., Professor of Biology, University of California, San Diego
 Paul Kwilecki, Photographer, Bainbridge, Georgia
 Tsit-Yuen Lam, Professor of Mathematics, University of California, Berkeley
 Benjamin Lax, Director Emeritus, Francis Bitter National Magnet Laboratory, M.I.T., Professor Emeritus of Physics, Massachusetts Institute of Technology
 Henry Marshall Leicester, Jr., Professor of English Literature, University of California, Santa Cruz
 Hope Jensen Leichter, Elbenwood Professor of Education, Teachers College, Columbia University
 John Anthony Lennon, Composer; Professor of Music, University of Tennessee
 William Carl Lineberger, E. U. Condon Distinguished Professor of Chemistry, University of Colorado, Boulder
 Richard J. Lipton, Professor of Electrical Engineering and Computer Science, Princeton University
 Peter J. Loewenberg, Professor of History, University of California, Los Angeles
 Mason Ira Lowance, Jr., Professor of English, University of Massachusetts Amherst
 Tom C. Lubensky, Mary Amanda Wood Professor of Physics, University of Pennsylvania
 Robert E. Lucas, Jr., John Dewey Distinguished Service Professor of Economics, University of Chicago
 Pedro Lujan, Artist, New York City
 William A. Lundberg, Artist; Professor of Art, University of Texas at Austin
 Paul Michael Lützeler, Rosa May Distinguished University Professor in the Humanities, Washington University in St. Louis
 Bernd Magnus, Professor of Philosophy; director, Center for Ideas and Society, University of California, Riverside
 William Maguire, Photographer; Professor of Visual Arts, Florida International University
 Alfred K. Mann, Bernard & Ida Grossman Professor of Physics, University of Pennsylvania
 Zohar Manna, Professor of Computer Science, Stanford University
 Peter J. Manning, Professor of English, State University of New York at Stony Brook
 Francisco Márquez-Villanueva, Alice Kingsley Porter Professor of Romance Languages and Literatures, Harvard University
 Marianne W. Martin, Deceased. Fine Arts Research
 William Martin McClain, Professor of Chemistry, Wayne State University
 Paul A. McDonough, Photographer; Adjunct Associate Professor, Pratt Institute, Brooklyn, NY: 1981.
 Brooks McNamara, Professor of Performance Studies, New York University: 1981.
 Michael R. McVaugh, Professor of History, University of North Carolina at Chapel Hill: 1981.
 Devon W. Meek, Deceased. Chemistry: 1981.
 Jeffrey Mehlman, Associate Professor of French, Boston University: 1981.
 Thomas R. Metcalf, Professor of History, University of California, Berkeley: 1981.
 Michael Mewshaw, Writer, Charlottesville, Virginia: 1981.
 John Meyendorff, Deceased. Religion: 1981.
 W. J. T. Mitchell, Professor of English, University of Chicago: 1981.
 Luke W. Mo, Professor of Physics, Virginia Polytechnic Institute and State University: 1981.
 Mauricio Montal, Professor of Biology, Adjunct Professor Psychiatry, University of California, San Diego: 1981.
 Roy P. Mottahedeh, Gurney Professor of History and Director, Center for Middle Eastern Studies, Harvard University: 1981.
 Lavonne Mueller, Playwright, New York City: 1981.
 Carol Muske, Poet; Professor of English and Creative Writing, University of Southern California: 1981.
 Joel Arthur Myerson, Carolina Distinguished Professor of American Literature, University of South Carolina: 1981.
 Tetsuo Najita, Robert S. Ingersoll Distinguished Service Professor in History and Japanese Studies, University of Chicago: 1981.
 Kenneth Henry Nealson, Senior Research Scientist, Jet Propulsion Laboratory, Pasadena, California: 1981.
 Colbert Ivor Nepaulsingh, Associate Vice President for Academic Affairs, SUNY-Albany: 1981.
 Charles Eric Neu, Professor of History, Brown University: 1981.
 Laura Mené Newman, Artist; Instructor, Cooper Union, New York: 1981.
 James Carson Nohrnberg, Professor of English, University of Virginia: 1981.
 Tim O'Brien, Writer, Cambridge, Massachusetts: 1981.
 Sharon Olds, director, Creative Writing Program, New York University: 1981.
 Albert Padwa, William Patterson Timmie Professor of Chemistry, Emory University: 1981.
 Robert Treat Paine, Emeritus Professor of Zoology, University of Washington: 1981.
 Nell Irvin Painter, Professor of History; Acting Director, Afro-American Studies Program, Princeton University: 1981.
 Thomas Lee Pangle, Professor of Political Science, University of Toronto: 1981.
 Loren Wayne Partridge, Professor of the History of Art, University of California, Berkeley: 1981.
 John F. Peck, Poet, Cambridge, Massachusetts: 1981.
 Marjorie G. Perloff, Sadie Dernham Patek Professor Emeritus of Humanities, Stanford University: 1981.
 Lewis Curtis Perry, John Francis Bannon Professor of History and American Studies, St. Louis University: 1981. Honoring John Francis Bannon
 William Samuel Peterson, Professor of English, University of Maryland at College Park: 1981.
 Tobias Picker, Composer, New York City
 Charles R. Plott, Edward S. Harkness Professor of Economics and Political Science, California Institute of Technology: 1981.
 Joel Porte, Ernest I. White Professor of American Studies and Humane Letters, Cornell University: 1981.
 Joanna Pousette-Dart, Painter, New York City: 1981.
 Curtis Alexander Price, Principal, The Royal Academy of Music, London: 1981.
 Maureen Quilligan, May Department Stores Company Professor of English, University of Pennsylvania: 1981.
 Alexander Rabinowitch, Professor of History and Dean of International Programs, Indiana University: 1981.
 Vladimir Rif, Film Maker, New York City: 1981.
 Lawrence Rosen, Chair, Professor of Anthropology, Princeton University: 1981.
 Alexander Rosenberg, Former Professor of Philosophy, University of California, Riverside: 1981.
 Margaret W. Rossiter, Marie Underhill Noll Professor of the History of Science, Cornell University: 1981.
 Meridel Rubenstein, Photographer; Instructor, Santa Fe Community College: 1981.
 Sara Rudner, Choreographer, New York City; director, Dance Program, Sarah Lawrence College: 1981
 Richard Ruland, Professor of English, Washington University in St. Louis
 Michael Ryan, Poet, Professor of English, University of California, Irvine: 1981.
 Harvey Sachs, Writer, Arezzo, Italy: 1981.
 Wendy Lang Salinger, Poet, Wainscott, New York: 1981.
 Nicolás Sánchez-Albornoz, Kenan Professor Emeritus of History, New York University: 1981.
 Michael Schaller, Professor of History, University of Arizona: 1981.
 James Schevill, Writer; Retired Professor of English, Brown University: 1981.
 Thomas J. Schopf, Deceased. Biology: 1981.
 James Marcus Schuyler, Deceased. Poetry: 1981.
 Paul A. Schweitzer, Professor of Mathematics, Pontifical Catholic University of Rio de Janeiro: 1981.
 Arden Scott, Artist, Greenport, New York: 1981.
 Nicholas Z. Scoville, Professor of Astronomy, California Institute of Technology: 1981.
 Andrew Tennant Scull, Professor of Sociology and Science Studies, University of California, San Diego: 1981.
 Meryle Secrest, Writer, Rockville, Maryland: 1981.
 Charles P. Segal, Walter C. Klein Professor of the Classics, Harvard University: 1981.
 Julius L. Shaneson, Professor of Mathematics, and Francis J. Carey Chair, University of Pennsylvania: 1981.
 Ntozake Shange, Writer, Philadelphia: 1981.
 Peter L. Shillingsburg, Professor of English, University of North Texas: 1981.
 Raymond Siever, Emeritus Professor of Geology, Harvard University: 1981.
 Burton Herbert Singer, Professor of Demography and Public Affairs, Princeton University: 1981.
 Meredith Anne Skura, Professor of English, Rice University: 1981.
 Thomas O. Sloane, Professor Emeritus of Rhetoric, University of California, Berkeley: 1981.
 Dave Smith, Boyd Professor of English, Louisiana State University, and Coeditor, The Southern Review, Baton Rouge: 1981.
 Roger M. Spanswick, Professor of Plant Physiology, Cornell University: 1981.
 Roswell Howard Spears, Film Maker; director, James Agee Film Project, State College, Pennsylvania: 1981.
 J. E. R. Staddon, James B. Duke Professor of Psychology and Professor of Zoology, Duke University: 1981.
 Paul Elliot Starr, Professor of Sociology, Princeton University; co-editor, The American Prospect: 1981.
 W. Clark Still, Jr., Professor of Chemistry, Columbia University: 1981.
 Tison C. Street, Composer, Boston, Massachusetts: 1981.
 Barry G. Stroud, Professor of Philosophy, University of California, Berkeley: 1981.
 John Floyd Sturgeon, Video Artist, Troy, New York: 1981.
 Jon Swan, Writer, Canaan, Connecticut; associate editor, School of Journalism, Columbia University: 1981.
 Larry Michael Sweet, Engineer, Burlington, Connecticut: 1981
 Stanley Jeyaraja Tambiah, Professor of Anthropology and Curator of Southeast Asian Ethnology in the Peabody Museum, Harvard University: 1981.
 Saul Arno Teukolsky, Hans A. Bethe Professor of Physics and Astronomy, Cornell University: 1981.
 Leonard M. Thompson, Charles T. Stillé Professor Emeritus of History, Yale University; director, Southern African Research Program, Yale: 1981.
 Leslie L. Threatte, Jr., Professor of Classics, University of California, Berkeley: 1981.
 Janet Margaret Todd, Fellow, Sussex College, Cambridge, England: 1981.
 Marianna Torgovnick, Associate Chair of English Department; Professor of English, Duke University: 1981.
 Robert Edward Tracy, Emeritus Professor of English and Celtic Studies, University of California, Berkeley: 1981.
 Billie Lee Turner II, Milton P. and Alice C. Higgins Professor of Environment and Society, Clark University: 1981.
 Frederick Turner, Writer; Founders Professor, School of Arts and Humanities, University of Texas at Dallas, Richardson: 1981.
 Donald Robert Uhlmann, Professor of Materials Science and Engineering, University of Arizona, Tucson: 1981.
 Eugene Charles Ulrich, Professor of Hebrew Scriptures, University of Notre Dame: 1981.
 John Von Hartz, Writer, New York City: 1981.
 David B. Wake, Professor of Integrative Biology, Curator of Herpetology, and Director, Museum of Vertebrate Zoology, University of California, Berkeley: 1981.
 John Walker, Artist, Brookline, Massachusetts: 1981.
 Gerald C. Weales, Professor Emeritus of English, University of Pennsylvania: 1981.
 Michael Weil, Film Maker, San Francisco: 1981.
 Otto Karl Werckmeister, Mary Jane Crowe Distinguished Professor of Art History, Northwestern University: 1981.
 Roger J. B. Wets, Professor of Mathematics, University of California, Davis: 1981.
 David Anthony Wevill, Poet; Associate Professor of English, University of Texas at Austin: 1981.
 Robert Huddleston Wiebe, Emeritus Professor of History, Northwestern University: 1981.
 Henry G. Wilhelm, Writer, Grinnell, Iowa; Director of Research, Preservation Publishing Company: 1981.
 Mira Wilkins, Professor of Economics, Florida International University: 1981.
 Samm-Art Williams, Playwright: 1981.
 Joan Hoff Wilson, Professor of History and Director, Contemporary History Institute, Ohio University: 1981.
 James Irving Wimsatt, Louann and Larry Temple Centennial Professor Emeritus of English, University of Texas at Austin: 1981.
 Saul Winegrad, Professor of Physiology, University of Pennsylvania School of Medicine: 1981.
 David Weaver Wing, Photographer; Coordinator of the Photography Program, Grossmont College: 1981.
 Isaac Witkin, Sculptor, Pemberton, New Jersey: 1981.
 Lee Alan Witters, Eugene W. Leonard Professor of Medicine & Biochemistry; Chief, Endrocine/Metabolism Division, Dartmouth Medical School: 1981.
 Robert Wohl, Professor of History, University of California, Los Angeles: 1981.
 John Womack, Jr., Robert Woods Bliss Professor of Latin American History and Economics, Harvard University: 1981.
 Robert Wayne Woody, Professor of Biochemistry, Colorado State University: 1981.
 Donald E. Worster, Hall Distinguished Professor of American History, University of Kansas: 1981.
 Richard S. Wortman, Professor of History, Columbia University: 1981.
 George T. Wright, Regents Professor Emeritus of English, University of Minnesota: 1981.
 Carl Isaac Wunsch, Cecil and Ida Green Professor of Physical Oceanography, Massachusetts Institute of Technology: 1981.
 Maurice Zeitlin, Professor of Sociology, University of California, Los Angeles: 1981.
 Ramon Zupko, Composer; Emeritus Professor of Music Composition, Western Michigan University: 1981.
 Menachem Zur, Composer; Bronx, New York: 1981.

1981 Latin American and Caribbean Fellows

 Hugo Aréchiga, Chief, Postgraduate and Research Studies, Universidad Nacional Autonoma de México, Mexico City: 1981.
 Reinaldo Arenas, Deceased. Fiction: 1981.
 Lourdes Arizpe, Research Professor of Social Anthropology, College of Mexico, Mexico City: 1981.
 Paulo Bruscky, Artist, Recife, Brazil: 1981.
 Carlos F. Bunge, Senior Research Physicist, Institute of Physics, and Professor of Physics and Chemistry, Biomedical Institute, National Autonomous University of Mexico, Mexico City: 1981.
 German Cáceres, Composer; president, El Salvador Council for Music: 1981.
 Adolfo Canitrot, Senior Research Economist, Center for Studies of the State and Society, Buenos Aires: 1981.
 Rodolfo Cerrón-Palomino, Professor of Linguistics and Director, Center for Applied Linguistics, National University of San Marcos, Lima: 1981.
 Miguel Cervantes, Artist, Mexico City: 1981.
 Teresa del Conde, director, Museum of Fine Arts, Bosque de Chapultepec, Mexico City: 1981.
 Luis Frangella, Deceased. Fine Arts: 1981
 Griselda Gambaro, Writer, Buenos Aires: 1981.
 Néstor García Canclini, Research Professor of Social Anthropology, National School of Anthropology and History, Mexico City; director, Center for Documentation and Research, National Institute of Fine Arts, Mexico City: 1981.
 Belita Koiller, Professor of Physics, Universidade Federal do Rio de Janeiro: 1981.
 Daniel Leyva, Poet; Assistant Director of Cultural Affairs, Ministry of Foreign Relations, Mexico, D.F.: 1981.
 Sergio Miceli Pessôa de Barros, Fuel Professor of Sociology, University of São Paulo: 1981.
 Lygia Carvalho Pape, Artist; Adjunct Professor, Center for Architecture and Art, Santa Ursula University, Rio de Janeiro: 1981.
 María Blanca París Oddone, Historian, Montevideo: 1981.
 Arnaldo F. Rocha, Professor of Chemistry, University of Amazonas; Research Chemist, National Research Institute of the Amazon, Manaus: 1981.
 José Luis Saborío, Professor of Cell Biology, Center for Research and Advanced Studies, National Polytechnic Institute, Mexico City: 1981.
 Affonso Romano de Sant'Anna, Poet; Professor of Literature, Pontifical Catholic University of Rio de Janeiro: 1981.
 Juan Pablo Terra, Deceased. Political Science: 1981.
 Patricio von Hildebrand, director, Amazon Research Program, Bogotá: 1981.

See also
Guggenheim Fellowship

External links
 Guggenheim Foundation home page

1981
1981 awards